Yi Cui (born 1976) is a Chinese-American materials scientist, specializing in nanotechnology, and energy and environment-related research. Cui is the Fortinet Founders Professor of Materials Science and Engineering, and by courtesy, of Chemistry at Stanford University. He currently serves as the director of the Precourt Institute for Energy, succeeding Arun Majumdar and Sally Benson. He also serves as a co-director of the Bay Area Photovoltaics Consortium, the Battery500 Consortium, and the StorageX initiative. He is a faculty member of Stanford Photon Science of SLAC and principal investigator at the Stanford Institute for Materials & Energy Sciences. He is an elected member of the National Academy of Sciences, and Fellow of the American Association for the Advancement of Science (AAAS), Materials Research Society (MRS), Electrochemical Society (ECS), and the Royal Society of Chemistry (RSC). He has been one of the world's most-cited researchers (Clarivate Analytics) and most influential scientific minds (Thomson Reuters). He has published over 540 research papers with an H-index of 248 (Google Scholar). He currently serves as the Executive Editor of Nano Letters from ACS Publications.

Early life and education 
Cui was born in Laibin, Guangxi, China. He obtained his B.S. in Chemistry from the University of Science and Technology of China in 1998. He pursued his graduate study in physical chemistry with Charles M. Lieber at Harvard University and obtained his Ph.D. in 2002. At Harvard, he pioneered nanoscale sensors and devices for highly sensitive detection based on the silicon nanowire technology. After that, he went to work as a Miller Postdoctoral Fellow with A. Paul Alivisatos at the University of California, Berkeley. At Berkeley, he worked on electronic property and assembly of colloidal nanostructures. In 2005, he joined the Department of Materials Science and Engineering at Stanford University as an assistant professor and started to pursue energy and environment-related research. He was granted tenure in 2010 and promoted to full professor in 2016.

Research and career 
In 2004, Steven Chu became the director of Lawrence Berkeley National Laboratory, where Chu launched several major initiatives centered on clean energy. Influenced by Chu's advocate on energy and climate change during his postdoctoral study at Berkeley, Cui decided to dedicate his Stanford lab to clean energy research and related topics. In 2008, his team reported "High-performance lithium battery anodes using silicon nanowires", which triggered global interests in the use of nanotechnology and nanomaterials for energy storage. Over the years, he has largely contributed to materials design for high energy-density batteries, grid-scale storage, and the safety of batteries. His group also covers a diverse array of research topics, such as solar cells, two-dimensional materials, electrocatalysis, textile engineering, water technology, air filtration, soil cleanup, and bio-nano interface. Cui is the most cited author of several journals covering nanotechnology including Nature Communications, Nano Letters, ACS Central Science, Nature Energy, Nano Today.

In 2016, Cui took inspirations from structural biology and employed cryogenic electron microscopy (Cryo-EM) to image batteries at an atomic resolution for the first time. The high-resolution imaging unveiled the nature of lithium dendrites, providing mechanistic insights into the nanostructure of solid-electrolyte interphase (SEI). Currently, his group is implementing Cryo-EM to probe atomic and molecular details in the metal-organic framework, perovskite, and other nanomaterials.

During the recent COVID-19 pandemic, Cui assembled a team with Steven Chu to investigate the reuse of respirators and face masks after different disinfection treatments. Cui and coworkers showed that the heat treatment (75˚C for 30 min or 85˚C for 20 min) decontaminated SARS-CoV-2 and other RNA viruses from the mask fabric without compromising its filtration efficiency.

Cui has established close collaboration with a number of Stanford faculty, including Steven Chu, Zhenan Bao, Robert Huggins, William Nix, Shanhui Fan, Wah Chiu, Bianxiao Cui, Harold Y. Hwang, Craig Criddle, Alexandria Boehm, Mark Brongersma, Michael McGehee, Zhi-Xun Shen, Shoucheng Zhang, Michael Toney, and Hongjie Dai, as well as Gang Chen from MIT.

He has also founded several companies to commercialize the technological breakthroughs from his research group: Amprius Inc. (traded as NYSE: AMPX), 4C Air Inc., EEnovate Technology Inc., EnerVenue Inc., and LifeLabs Design.

Accolades 

 Elected Member of the National Academy of Sciences (2022) 
 Global Energy Prize, The Global Energy Association (2021)
The Ernest Orlando Lawrence Award, U.S. Department of Energy (2021)
Fellow of American Association for the Advancement of Science (AAAS) (2020)
MRS Medal, Materials Research Society (2020)
Battery Division Technology Award, The Electrochemical Society (2019)
 International Automotive Lithium Battery Association's Research Award (2019)
 Dan Maydan Prize in Nanoscience (2019)
 Nano Today Award (2019)
 Fellow of The Electrochemical Society (2018)
 Blavatnik National Laureate in Physical Sciences and Engineering (2017)
 Blavatnik National Award Finalist (2016)
 Top 10 World Changing Ideas (cooling textile) by Scientific American (2016)
 MRS Fellow (2016)
 MRS Kavli Distinguished Lectureship in Nanoscience (2015)
 Fellow of Royal Society of Chemistry (2015)
 Small Young Innovator Awards (2015)
 Resonate Award for Sustainability (2015)
 Inorganic Chemistry Frontiers Award for Young Scientist (2015)
 Inaugural Schlumberger Chemistry Lectureship at University of Cambridge (2015)
 Top 10 World Changing Ideas (batteries that capture low-grade waste heat) by Scientific American (2014)
 Bau Family Awards in Inorganic Chemistry (2014)
 Inaugural Nano Energy Award Winner (2014)
 Blavatnik National Award Finalist (2014)
 IUPAC Distinguished Award for Novel Materials and Their Synthesis (2013)
 Scientist in Residence at the University of Duisburg-Essen (2013)
 Next Power Visiting Chair Professorship at National Tsing Hua University (2013)
 E. Bright Wilson Prize, Harvard University (2011)
 David Filo and Jerry Yang Faculty Scholar, Stanford University (2010-2014)
 Top 10 World Changing Ideas (water disinfection nanofilters) by Scientific American (2010)≠
 Sloan Research Fellowship, Alfred P. Sloan Foundation (2010)
 The Global Energy and Climate Energy Project Distinguished Lectureship (2009)
 Investigator Award, KAUST (2008)
 Young Investigator Award, The Office of Naval Research (2008)
 Innovators Award, Mohr Davidow Ventures (2008)
 Terman Fellowship, Stanford University (2005)
 Top 100 Young Innovator Award, Technology Review (2004)
 Miller Research Fellowship, Miller Institute (2003)
 Distinguished Graduate Student Award in Nanotechnology, Foresight Institute (2002)
 Graduate Student Gold Medal Award, Materials Research Society (2001)

Business activities 
In 2008, Cui founded Amprius Technologies to commercialize silicon anodes for high energy density lithium-ion batteries. Over the past decade, the original concept developed by Cui's team has evolved into the first commercially produced lithium-ion battery that employs a 100% silicon nanowire anode with breakthrough performance approaching 500 Wh/kg over hundreds of cycles. Amprius has recently partnered with Airbus to boost the development of next-generation batteries based on Silicon Nanowire Anode technology. In September 2022, Amprius completed its SPAC merger with a unit of Kensington Capital and began trading on the NYSE under the ticker symbol AMPX. 

In 2015, Cui co-founded 4C Air Inc., together with Steven Chu, aiming to bring clean air through innovative nanomaterials. This establishment was motivated by the increased morbidity and mortality associated with air pollution, mostly in developing countries. In particular, particulate matter with a diameter lower than 2.5 microns (PM2.5) is the most consistent and robust predictor of mortality in studies of long-term exposure. 4C Air harnesses the technology developed at Cui's group at Stanford and is currently developing products and solutions for PM2.5.

In 2017, Cui founded EEnovate Technology to develop nanotechnology for energy-related and environmental issues, including water purification, grid-scale energy storage, and smart wearable textiles. Recently, EEnovate is recognized by "Start-up City Magazine" as one of the most promising start-ups for its wearable technology. In 2018, EEnovate Technology was renamed EEnotech, Inc. to serve as a technology foundry focusing on sustainability.

In 2020, Cui launched EnerVenue as a spinout of EEnotech to develop metal-hydrogen batteries for large-scale renewable energy storage. EnerVenue aims to bring the metal-hydrogen battery technology that powers the international space station into a clean energy revolution, even under extremely challenging climate conditions.

In 2021, Cui launched Lifelabs Design as a spinoff of EEnotech to commercialize textile technology initially developed in his lab at Stanford. Lifelabs aims to reduce personal energy usage through new textile products and solutions.

Personal life 
Cui is an avid soccer player and plays midfielder to orchestrate offense and defense. He currently serves on the board of Asian-American Youth Soccer Academy (AAYSA), a non-profit agency in San Francisco.

References

External links 

 Cui Research Group Website
 Yi Cui - Google Scholar
 Yi Cui - NAS Member Directory 
 Stanford Faculty - Meet Yi Cui
 Science Newsletter: How to build a better battery through nanotechnology
 Interview with Carbon Energy
 Batteries: Now and Future (MIT Energy Initiative)
 Stanford Magazine: Charging Ahead
 Stanford Energy Global Programs

1976 births
Living people
Chinese materials scientists
Scientists from Guangxi
People from Laibin
University of Science and Technology of China alumni
Harvard Graduate School of Arts and Sciences alumni
Stanford University faculty
American materials scientists
Chinese emigrants to the United States
American nanotechnologists
Sloan Research Fellows
Fellows of the Royal Society of Chemistry
Fellows of the American Association for the Advancement of Science
Members of the United States National Academy of Sciences